Thomas Evans (Tomos Glyn Cothi) (20 June 1764 – 29 January 1833), was a Welsh poet, Unitarian, and political activist.

Early life and work
Evans, son of Evan and Hannah Evans, was born at Capel Sant Silyn, Gwernogle, Carmarthenshire. His birthplace was not far from the Cothi River, from which he later took his bardic name, Tomos Glyn Cothi. He seems to have had little early education, but by following his craft as a weaver, he frequented the fairs of Glamorgan, selling his cloth. In this way, he came into contact with the poets of Glamorgan and their bardic traditions. He was at the gorsedd of Mynydd y Garth in the midsummer of 1797. He also had access to books, and Theophilus Lindsey assisted by sending him English books from 1792 until 1796.

Religious affiliations
Evans lived in an area which was predominantly Calvinist, but as early as 1786 he began to preach having embraced the doctrines of Unitarianism. He was nicknamed "Little Priestley". In order to worship with friends of like sentiments with himself, he used to walk to Alltyblaca, twelve miles away. When he grew up, he began to preach in his father's house, a part of which he got licensed for the purpose. In time, a chapel was built. He was personally much respected, but his liberalism made him suspected by government.

Imprisoned for a song
He spoke warmly and wrote largely. In 1797, he was at a social meeting and sang by request a Welsh song, "On Liberty". On the information of a spy belonging to his own congregation, he was apprehended, tried, and sentenced by Judge Lloyd to be imprisoned for two years and to stand in the pillory. He was charged with singing an English song, the fourth stanza of which ran thus:
And when upon the British shore
The thundering guns of France shall roar,
Vile George shall trembling stand,
Or flee his native land
With terror and appal,
Dance Carmagnol, dance Carmagnol.
He always denied having sung this song. During his imprisonment, he was met with great sympathy.

Hen-Dy-Cwrdd
In 1811, he became the minister of the Old Meeting House, Aberdare, where he continued to be beloved and respected until his death on 29 January 1833.

Writings
His first publication was probably a translation of Priestley's Triumph of Truth, being an Account of the Trial of Elwall for publishing a book in Defense of the Unity of God, 1793. Altogether, he published more than twenty works, most of them theological. In 1795, he issued No. 1 of a quarterly magazine, The Miscellaneous Repository, which had to be discontinued with No. 3 for lack of sufficient support. In 1809, he published an English-Welsh dictionary, compiled while in prison. In 1811, he published a hymn-book of a hundred hymns, all original. A second edition appeared in 1822.

References

Sources

Online

1764 births
1833 deaths
Welsh poets
Poetry